The Women's 800 metres at the 2000 Summer Olympics as part of the athletics programme was held at Stadium Australia on Friday 22 September, Saturday 23 September, and Monday 25 September 2000.

The top two runners in each of the initial five heats automatically qualified for the semi-final. The next six fastest runners from across the heats also qualified for the semi-final.

The top three runners in each semi-final automatically qualified for the final. The next two fastest runners from across the heats also qualified for the final.

There were a total number of 39 participating athletes.

In the final, Helena Fuchsova took her lane 1 position out to the lead, with Brigita Langerholc sweeping across the track from lane 8 to shut the door on Hazel Clark and the rest of the pack.  Fuchsova held the lead through a 55.04 first lap and on to 600 metres in 1:25.5.  Behind her the pack scrambled for position with Kelly Holmes on Fuchsova's shoulder.  Holmes, then Maria Mutola, then Stephanie Graf all passed on the final turn.  On the final straightaway, Mutola rans strong on the outside, advancing past Holmes, with Graf sprinting past for silver.  Four years later, it would be reversed, with Holmes running past Mutoloa on the final straight.

Records

Medals

Results
All times shown are in seconds.
 Q denotes qualification by place in heat.
 q denotes qualification by overall place.
 DNS denotes did not start.
 DNF denotes did not finish.
 DQ denotes disqualification.
 NR denotes national record.
 OR denotes Olympic record.
 WR denotes world record.
 PB denotes personal best.
 SB denotes season best.

Qualifying heats

Round 1

Overall Results Round 1

Semi-finals

Overall Results Semi-finals

Final

References

External links
 Official Report
 Official Report of the 2000 Sydney Summer Olympics

 
800 metres at the Olympics
2000 in women's athletics
Women's events at the 2000 Summer Olympics